Charles Paul Gardetto (18 February 1904 – 24 March 1989) was a Monegasque rower. He competed in the men's coxed four event at the 1928 Summer Olympics.

References

1904 births
1989 deaths
Monegasque male rowers
Olympic rowers of Monaco
Rowers at the 1928 Summer Olympics